El Indomable is the 11th studio album by Cristian Castro. It was his first ranchera and mariachi crossover attempt. It iwas produced by Pedro Ramírez and Vicente Fernández. The first single released from the album was José Alfredo Jiménez's "Tu Retirada". Up to July 11, 2007, the album has sold 12,868 copies in the US. El Indomable was nominated at The Latin Grammy Awards of 2007 for Regional Mexican Album of the Year.

Track listing
 ¿Que Amor Me Quedará?
 Golondrina Presumida - (featuring Vicente Fernández)
 Te Sigo Queriendo
 Mi México De Ayer
 No Volveré
 Divina Ilusión
 Tu Retirada
 Sin Fé Y Sin Religión
 Si Acaso Vuelves
 El Indomable

Bonus tracks (gold edition)
 Hay Un Momento
 Presentimiento
 La Caminera
 Morena De Ojos Negros (featuring Vicente Fernández)
 No Soy Monedita De Oro (iTunes exclusive)

Chart positions

Sales and certifications

References

2007 albums
Cristian Castro albums
Universal Music Latino albums